North Carolina Highway 6 (NC 6) was an  North Carolina state highway. It ran entirely in Guilford County and served primarily to connect Interstate 40 (I-40) and Business I-85 (I-85 Bus.) commuters in Greensboro. It was decommissioned in 2005.

Route description
The western terminus of NC 6 was at I-40 and U.S. Route 421 (US 421) at I-40's exit 216 in West Greensboro. The interchange only allowed for eastbound I-40 / southbound US 421 traffic to enter eastbound NC 6 and vice versa. NC 6 then turned to the northeast and followed High Point Road onto Lee Street. NC 6 intersected O'Henry Boulevard (U.S. Route 29 (US 29), US 70, and US 220). The state highway continued east bending slightly to the south before ending at I-40 and I-85 Bus. at their exit 224.

History

 1934: NC 6 is commissioned as a short road located southwest of Lake Mattamuskeet in Hyde County.
 1944: NC 6 is decommissioned and not replaced.
 1947: A new NC 6 cuts off the corner between NC 49 and U.S. Route 52 in Stanly County. It replaced NC 49A.
 1953: NC 8 is extended, moving NC 6.
 1959: After moving to its current location, a couple of timely shifts allowed NC 6 to follow its current route.
 2000s (decade): Recent changes have slightly altered the path of NC 6 around the I-40 interchange and the Greensboro Coliseum.
 2005: NC 6 decommissioned, signs not taken down until around May 2009. As of October 2010, Google Maps still shows NC 6.
 2015: High Point Road and Lee Street, which was NC 6 east of Patterson Street, renamed Gate City Boulevard.

Major intersections

See also
Greensboro Bypass
Death Valley (North Carolina)

References

External links

Former state highways in North Carolina